Argyrotaenia griseina is a species of moth of the family Tortricidae. It is found in Peru.

The wingspan is about 20 mm. The ground colour of the forewings is whitish, slightly tinged with grey and with blackish grey strigulation (fine streaks). The markings are greyish black spotted with black. The hindwings are whitish, mixed with grey in the apical portion.

Etymology
The species name refers to the colouration of the forewings and is derived from Latin griseina (meaning mottled grey).

References

Moths described in 2010
griseina
Moths of South America